América Barrio (1917–2001) was a Cuban stage, television and film actress.

Biography 
America Barrio born in Santiago de Cuba  (11 September 1917) since she was just a girl she participated on all her school cultural acts.

When she was 12 years old she started singing on birthday parties and charities.

America Barrio study music and singing theory in the Municipal Conservatory of Havana, (today called Amadeo Roldan Conservatory).

She couldn't make much of a career on lyric singing so she started working on  radio stations on music programs. On that time she met Juan Manuel Jorge Reyes an actor and director of live radio plays. 

He needed an actress for one of the radio productions at that time. America was the perfect match, but she didn't think she was experience enough. Jorge Reyes hired her anyway  and since then they work together on cinema, theater, tv and radio.

Selected filmography

Films
1950, The Yacht Isabel Arrived This Afternoon.
1942, Pobre hija mía.
1951 Six Months of Life

Television
 1964, Historia de tres hermanas.(RCTV)
 1970, Cristina.(RCTV) - Doña Graciela Lopez-Castro
 1971, La usurpadora.(RCTV) - Fidelia
 1972, Sacrificio de mujer.(RCTV) - Leonor
 1972, La doña.(RCTV) - Genoveva
 1973, La italianita.(RCTV) - Dionisia
 1973, Raquel.(RCTV) - Tía Leoacadia.
 1974, Bárbara.
 1976, Carolina.(RCTV) - María.
 1977, Iliana (telenovela).(RCTV)
 1978, La fiera.(RCTV)
 1979, Mabel Valdez, periodista.(RCTV)
 1979, Estefanía.(RCTV) - Doña María Gracia De Cataldo
 1981, Luisana mía.(RCTV) - Luisa
 1982, Jugando a vivir.(RCTV) - Doña Amalia
 1983, Leonela.(RCTV) - Doña Marta
 1983, Bienvenida Esperanza.(RCTV) - Doña Mercedes de Trias
 1985, Topacio (telenovela).(RCTV) - Doña Hortensia Vda. de Andrade
 1985, Cristal.(RCTV) - Doña Lucrecia De Bellorin
 1986, Atrévete (telenovela).(RCTV)
 1987, Selva María.(RCTV) - Doña Mirita
 1988, Alma mía (telenovela).(RCTV) - Providencia Monagas
 1988, Abigail.(RCTV) - Madre Teresa
 1989, Pobre negro.(RCTV) - Doña Águeda De Alcorta
 1990, Anabel.(RCTV) - Doña María
 1992, Por estas calles.(RCTV) -
 1998, Cambio de piel.(RCTV)

References

Bibliography 
 Rist, Peter H. Historical Dictionary of South American Cinema. Rowman & Littlefield, 2014.

External links 
 

1917 births
2001 deaths
Cuban film actresses
Cuban stage actresses
Cuban television actresses
People from Santiago de Cuba